Sord or SORD may refer to:

 Swords, Dublin (Irish: Sord), a town in Ireland
 Sord Computer Corporation, a Japanese electronics company
 SORD, a gene

See also 
 Sword (disambiguation)
 Sorde (disambiguation)